Year 1040 (MXL) was a leap year starting on Tuesday (link will display the full calendar) of the Julian calendar.

Events 
<onlyinclude>

By place

Europe 
 Spring – Nikephoros Dokeianos, Byzantine governor of the Catepanate of Italy, is murdered by Lombard rebels at Ascoli. He is replaced by Michael Dokeianos, who arrives in November with a Varangian army.
 The Emirate of Sicily is divided and fragmented into small fiefdoms. The Arab nobles of Palermo restore the regime of the Kalbids (approximate date).
 August 22 - 23 – Battle of Brůdek: Duke Bretislav I of Bohemia defeats the German forces under King Henry III (the Black) in the Bohemian Forest.
 Peter Delyan leads a rebellion against the Byzantine Empire and is proclaimed by the Bulgarian nobles as emperor (tsar) Peter II in Belgrade.

Britain 
 March 17 – King Harold Harefoot dies at Oxford at the age of 24. His illegitimate son Ælfwine Haroldsson is left in his grandmother's care, Ælfgifu of Northampton.
 June 17 – Harthacnut lands at Sandwich and reclaims the throne of England which has been taken by Harald Harefoot (see 1035).
 August 14 – King Duncan I is killed in battle against his first cousin and rival Macbeth, who succeeds him as king of Scotland.

Islamic world 
 May 23 – Battle of Dandanaqan: The Turkmen Seljuqs defeat the Ghaznavid forces (50,000 men) led by Sultan Mas'ud I at Dandanaqan, a fortress city in the desert near Merv.

By topic

Religion 
 Weihenstephan Abbey (Kloster Weihenstephan) in Germany, founds the oldest operating brewery.
 The Shalu Monastery is founded by the Buddhist monk Chetsun Sherab Jungnay in Tibet.
 Births 
 February 22 – Rashi, French rabbi and writer (d. 1105)
 July 12 – Yun Gwan, Korean general (d. 1111)
 Adelaide of Hungary, duchess of Bohemia (d. 1062)
 Alan Rufus, Norman nobleman (approximate date)
 Alfonso VI, king of León and Castile (approximate date)
 Al-Mu'tamid ibn Abbad, Abbadid emir of Seville (d. 1095)
 Arnold of Soissons, French bishop (approximate date)
 Blessed Gerard, founder of the Knights Hospitaller (d. 1120)
 Bonfilius, bishop of Foligno (approximate date)
 Conrad I, count of Luxembourg (approximate date)
 Elimar I (or Egilmar), count of Oldenburg (d. 1112) 
 Ernulf, French Benedictine monk and bishop (d. 1124)
 Gebhard III, bishop of Constance (approximate date)
 Geoffrey III, French nobleman (approximate date)
 Géza I (Magnus), king of Hungary (approximate date)
 Guglielmo Embriaco, Genoese merchant (d. 1102)
 Haziga of Diessen, German countess (approximate date)
 Harald III, king of Denmark (approximate date)
 Herman I, margrave of Baden (approximate date)
 Hugh I, French nobleman (approximate date)
 Hugh of Die, French bishop (approximate date)
 Ibn Aqil, Persian theologian and jurist (d. 1119)
 Ida of Lorraine, French countess (approximate date)
 Ivo of Chartres, French bishop (approximate date)
 Ladislaus I, king of Hungary (approximate date)
 Oddone Frangipane, Italian monk and hermit (d. 1127)
 Odo I (or Eudes), French nobleman (d. 1086)
 Roger I, Norman nobleman (approximate date)
 Sikelgaita, Lombard duchess of Apulia (d. 1090)
 Wulfnoth Godwinson, English nobleman (d. 1094)
 Xiao Guanyin, empress of the Liao Dynasty (d. 1075)
 Zayn al-Din Gorgani, Persian physician (d.  1136)

 Deaths 
 January 17 – Mas'ud I, Ghaznavid sultan (b. 998)
 March 3 – Cunigunde, Holy Roman Empress
 March 17 – Harold Harefoot, king of England
 May 29 – Renauld I, French nobleman
 June 21 – Fulk III, French nobleman (b. 970) 
 August 14 – Duncan I, king of Scotland
 October 1 – Alan III, duke of Brittany (b. 997)
 Abu Hashim al-Hasan, Zaidi imam and ruler of Jemen
 Abu Nasr Mushkan, Persian statesman (or 1039)
 Ali Daya, Ghaznavid commander-in-chief 
 Begtoghdi, Ghaznavid commander-in-chief
 Bertha of Milan, Lombard duchess (approximate date)
 Dietrich I, bishop of Meissen (approximate date)
 Gilbert, Norman nobleman (approximate date)
 Helias of Cologne, Irish abbot and musician
 Hugh, Italian nobleman (approximate date)
 Hugh I, count of Empúries and Peralada
 Ibn al-Haytham, Arab astronomer (approximate date)
 John V, duke of Gaeta (approximate date)
 Maria of Amalfi, Lombard duchess (approximate date)
 Nikephoros Dokeianos, Byzantine general
 Unsuri, Persian poet and writer (or 1039)
 Yeshe-Ö, Tibetan lama-king (approximate date)

References